Chris Brancato (born July 24, 1962) is an American television and film writer and producer. Brancato grew up in Teaneck, New Jersey and graduated in 1980 from Teaneck High School. He subsequently attended and graduated from Brown University.

Career
Brancato wrote or was story editor for several episodes of the 1992 season of Beverly Hills, 90210. He co-wrote the X-Files episode ”Eve“, which first aired on December 10, 1993. Brancato created and wrote Space Channel's First Wave, which aired from 1998 to 2001, and also wrote the 1998 film Species II.

Brancato wrote the 1997 film Hoodlum set in crime-ridden 1930s New York City.

Brancato was executive producer of the 2002 film Stealing Harvard. Brancato was also a writer/producer for the critically acclaimed 2002–2003 television series Boomtown.

Brancato wrote two episodes during season 12 of the long-running NBC legal drama, Law & Order: Special Victims Unit, titled "Branded" and "Spectacle". Brancato moved on to be executive producer/show runner/head writer for the tenth season of the USA Network police-procedural Law & Order: Criminal Intent, a show that is related to Law & Order: SVU. Brancato did a police-procedural pilot for NBC titled Blue Tilt, where he was creator/executive producer with Vincent D'Onofrio (Law & Order: Criminal Intent) and Ethan Hawke, who were also set to star in the project as well. On May 11, 2012, NBC decided not to bring it, and other pilots, to series. He created the Netflix series Narcos and Narcos: Mexico with Carlo Bernard and Doug Miro.

After going through several iterations, Brancato is credited as a co-screenwriter for third Sherlock Holmes film along with Joel Silver, Susan Downey and Lionel Wigram returning as producers, and Village Roadshow returning as co-producer. Warner Bros. have confirmed the third film will include Robert Downey, Jr. and Jude Law. The film had an expected release date December 22, 2021 but is currently undated.

Brancato is the screenwriter, executive producer, writer, and creator of the EPIX series Godfather of Harlem starring Forest Whitaker.

References

External links
 

Living people
American male screenwriters
Teaneck High School alumni
Film producers from New Jersey
1962 births
Screenwriters from New Jersey
Brown University alumni